Saudi Arabia competed at the 2004 Summer Olympics in Athens, Greece, from 13 to 29 August 2004.

Athletics

Saudi Arabian athletes have so far achieved qualifying standards in the following athletics events (up to a maximum of 3 athletes in each event at the 'A' Standard, and 1 at the 'B' Standard).

Men
Track & road events

Field events

Equestrian

Show jumping

Shooting 

Men

Swimming

Men

Table tennis

Weightlifting

Four Saudi Arabian weightlifters qualified for the following events:

See also
 Saudi Arabia at the 2002 Asian Games
 Saudi Arabia at the 2004 Summer Paralympics

References

External links
Official Report of the XXVIII Olympiad
Saudi Arabian Olympic Committee 

Nations at the 2004 Summer Olympics
2004
Summer Olympics